News Channel 3 Knowledge Bowl is a quiz bowl program created by WREG-TV in Memphis, Tennessee. It first aired in 1987 for the 1987–88 school year. The format is similar to a quiz show, in which teams come from 32 high schools around the Mid-South to participate. Contests between schools take place throughout the school year. Knowledge Bowl participants earn prizes depending on their standings.

Format 
Each game starts out with two teams with four contestants on each team. Two rounds lasting seven minutes are played when toss-up questions are asked dealing with many subjects. If a team member gets a question right, they get a bonus question to answer in which the team can discuss. If a team member gets a toss-up question wrong, the question goes to the other team to answer. If one of them gets it right, then that team gets a bonus question. Toss ups are worth 10 points and bonuses are worth 20 points. Points are not taken away for incorrect answers to toss up or bonus questions; however, if someone buzzes in too early with an incorrect response, a five-point penalty is assessed. In between the two rounds, an interview session is done with the contestants. After the second round, a "Lightning Round" composing of current events questions takes place. During this round, only toss ups are asked to save time. This round is dubbed as the "Fastest Four Minutes In Television." Whoever has the highest point total at the end of the game wins and advances in the next round.

Hosts 
For 18 years (1987–2005), co-founder Kyle Rote Jr., the son of Kyle Rote, hosted the show. WREG-TV meteorologist Jim Jaggers took Rote's place in 2006.

Prizes and scholarships 
According to the program's website, Knowledge Bowl and its sponsors have given away more than $3 million in college scholarships over 20 seasons, which is an average of $150,000 for each season. Scholarships are distributed in the following manner:

 Minimum Prize: $200 Savings Bond
 Advance to Second Round: $500 Scholarship to the University of Memphis
 Advance to Third Round: $1000 Scholarship
 Semifinalist: $1500 Scholarship
 finalist: $3000 Scholarship
 Champions: $7500 Scholarship

In addition to scholarships, participants attend a banquet in their honor every year after taping is complete. The winning schools are honored with trophies and every participant is given a gift from WREG-TV and their sponsors.

Participating schools 

 Lausanne Collegiate School (2017 Co-Champions)
 Desoto Central High School
 Memphis University School (2017 Co-Champions)
 Immaculate Conception High School
 Arlington High School (2019 Champions)
 Houston High School 
 Horn Lake High School
 Hughes High School (Hughes, Arkansas)
 Southaven High School
 Hutchison School
 St. George's Independent School
 Northside High School
 White Station High School
 Evangelical Christian School
 Bolton High School
 Brighton High School
 Munford High School
 Olive Branch High School
 Craigmont High School
 West Memphis Christian School
 Whitehaven High School
 Raleigh-Egypt High School
 Millington Central High School
 Germantown High School
 Collierville High School
 First Assembly Christian School
 Turrell High School
 Christian Brothers High School
 Bartlett High School
 Ripley High School
 St. Benedict at Auburndale
 Northpoint Christian School
 Covington High School
 Tipton-Rosemark Academy
 Hernando High School
 Oxford High School (Oxford, Mississippi) 
 Briarcrest Christian School (2016 Runners-up)
 Lewisburg High School
 Memphis Home Education Association

Programming schedule 
Knowledge Bowl airs every Saturday morning on WREG-TV Channel 3 between 9:00 and 9:30 AM during the school year. It re-airs on News Channel 3 Anytime (Channel 3.2). Sister station WHNT in Huntsville, Alabama, also airs the show on its digital sub-channel (WHNT-DT2 19.2) and usually broadcasts them more than one at a time from 8:30 to 11:30.

Sponsors

McDonald's
University of Memphis
Dobbs Ford
First Tennessee Bank
LeBonheur Children's Hospital
Thomas and Betts
The Assisi Foundation of Memphis

References

External links 
 Official Website

Student quiz television series